Glanders is a contagious zoonotic infectious disease that occurs primarily in horses, mules, and donkeys. It can be contracted by other animals, such as dogs, cats, pigs, goats, and humans. It is caused by infection with the bacterium Burkholderia mallei.

Glanders is endemic in Africa, Asia, the Middle East, and Central and South America. It has been eradicated from North America, Australia, and most of Europe through surveillance and destruction of affected animals, and import restrictions. It has not been reported in the United States since 1945, except in 2000, when an American lab researcher had an accidental exposure in the lab. It is a notifiable disease in the UK, although it has not been reported there since 1928.

The term is from Middle English  or Old French , both meaning glands.

Presentation
Signs of glanders include the formation of nodular lesions in the lungs and ulceration of the mucous membranes in the upper respiratory tract. The acute form results in coughing, fever, and the release of an infectious nasal discharge, followed by septicaemia and death within days. In the chronic form, nasal and subcutaneous nodules develop, eventually ulcerating; death can occur within months, while survivors act as carriers.

Cause and transmission

Glanders is caused by infection with the  Burkholderia mallei, usually by ingestion of contaminated feed or water. B. mallei is able to infect humans, so it is classed as a zoonotic agent. Transmission occurs by direct contact with infected animal's  body fluid and tissues and entry is through skin abrasions, nasal and oral mucosal surfaces, or inhalation.

Diagnosis
The mallein test is a sensitive and specific clinical test for glanders. Mallein, a protein fraction of the glanders organism (B. mallei), is injected intradermopalpebrally or given by eye drop. In infected animals, the eyelid swells markedly in 1 to 2 days.

Historical cases and potential use in war
Glanders has been known since antiquity, with a description by Hippocrates around 425 BCE.

From the Middle Ages to the 1900s, glanders was a significant threat to armies. Before the Battle of Blenheim in 1704, glanders may have afflicted and greatly diminished the horses of Marshal Tallard's cavalry, helping the Duke of Marlborough win the battle.

Glanders was a significant problem for civilian use of horses, as well. In the 18th-century veterinary hospital at the École Nationale Vétérinaire d'Alfort, glanders was the most common disease among their equine patients and the one most likely to cause death.

Due to the high mortality rate in humans and the small number of organisms required to establish infection, B. mallei is regarded as a potential biological warfare or bioterrorism agent, as is the closely related organism, B. pseudomallei, the causative agent of melioidosis. During World War I, glanders was believed to have been spread deliberately by German agents to infect large numbers of Russian horses and mules on the Eastern Front. Other agents attempted to introduce the disease in the United States and Argentina. This had an effect on troop and supply convoys, as well as on artillery movement, which were dependent on horses and mules. Human cases in Russia increased with the infections during and after WWI. The Japanese deliberately infected horses, civilians, and prisoners of war with B. mallei at the Unit 731 Pingfang (China) Institute and Unit 100 facilities during World War II. The U.S. studied this agent as a possible biological weapon in 1943–44, but did not weaponize it. U.S. interest in glanders (agent LA) continued through the 1950s, except it had an inexplicable tendency to lose virulence in the lab, making it difficult to weaponize. Between 1982 and 1984, the Soviet Union allegedly used weaponized B. mallei during the Soviet–Afghan War.

Vaccine research
No vaccine is licensed for use in the U.S. Infection with these bacteria results in nonspecific symptoms and can be either acute or chronic, impeding rapid diagnosis. The lack of a vaccine for either bacterium also makes them potential candidates for bioweaponization. Together, with their high rate of infectivity by aerosols and resistance to many common antibiotics, both bacteria have been classified as category B priority pathogens by the US NIH and US CDC, which has spurred a dramatic increase in interest in these microorganisms. Attempts have been made to develop vaccines for these infections, which would not only benefit military personnel, a group most likely to be targeted in an intentional release, but also individuals who may come in contact with glanders-infected animals or live in areas where melioidosis is endemic.

References

External links 
 CDC list of articles on glanders
 Current status of Glanders worldwide at OIE. WAHID Interface - OIE World Animal Health Information Database
 Disease card 
 Animal health aspects of glanders
 Center for Biosecurity Agent Fact Sheet
 Burkholderia mallei genomes and related information at PATRIC, a Bioinformatics Resource Center funded by NIAID
 Notes On Glander Disease in Horse

Bacterium-related cutaneous conditions
Biological anti-agriculture weapons
Biological weapons
Horse diseases
Zoonotic bacterial diseases